The Chartered Community of Navarre is divided in 12 regions —named eskualdeak in basque and comarcas in Spanish—, which are juridical figures constituted as local administrative divisions designed to provide local proximity services. They follow the ancient divisions of the Kingdom of Navarre, which include figures such as the merindade or the almiradio. Currently, Navarre is divided into 12 eskualdeak/comarcas (regions) and 4 azpieskualdeak/subcomarcas (subregions) since the 04/2019 Foral Law approved by the Barkos government on 2019. However, the process of dissolution of the old entities and creation of the new ones was stopped by the following Chivite government, making it today still unachieved, even though the eskualdeak/comarcas exist officially.

2019-today 
The actual distribution was approved by Barkos government via 04/2019 Foral Law, dividing Navarre in 12 eskualdeak/comarcas and 4 azpieskualdeak/subcomarcas:

2000-2019 

Until 2019, the division was made following Zonificación Navarra 2000, approved in 2000, which looked like the following:

References

Atlas de Navarra, Geografía e Historia, edited by the Departamento de Educación del Gobierno de Navarra y EGN Comunicación, 2006